Jameson Lopp is an American cypherpunk, software engineer, columnist, and Bitcoin advocate. Lopp is co-founder and CTO of bitcoin security provider Casa. Prior to joining Casa, Lopp served as software engineer at BitGo.

Lopp has been publicly involved in cryptocurrency dating back to 2012 and involved with Casa since 2018.

Lopp was the subject of a swatting attack in October 2017. As a result of the attack, Lopp made the decision to live off-the-grid, which has been written about in The New York Times. In the effort, Lopp purchased a decoy house, created a number of business entities, and paid private investigators to try and locate him. Lopp's whereabouts remain unknown.

References

Living people
Cypherpunks
Year of birth missing (living people)
Chief technology officers
People associated with Bitcoin